Cheney High School may refer to:

Cheney High School (Kansas) in Cheney, Kansas
Cheney High School (Washington), part of the Cheney School District in Spokane County, Washington

See also
Chaney High School in Youngstown, Ohio